Graciela Lina Boente Boente is an Argentine mathematical statistician at the University of Buenos Aires. She is known for her research in robust statistics, and particularly for robust methods for principal component analysis and regression analysis.

Education
Boente earned her Ph.D. in 1983 from the University of Buenos Aires. Her dissertation, Robust Principal Components, was supervised by Victor J. Yohai.

Awards and honors
Boente became a Guggenheim Fellow in 2001. In 2008, the Argentine National Academy of Exact, Physical and Natural Sciences gave her their Consecration Prize in recognition of her contributions and teaching. She became an honored fellow of the Institute of Mathematical Statistics in 2013, "for her research in robust statistics and estimation, and for outstanding service to the statistical community".

References

Year of birth missing (living people)
Living people
Argentine mathematicians
Argentine statisticians
Argentine women mathematicians
Women statisticians
University of Buenos Aires alumni
Academic staff of the University of Buenos Aires
Fellows of the Institute of Mathematical Statistics